Joseph Bryant Rotherham's Emphasized Bible (abbreviated EBR to avoid confusion with the REB) is a translation of the Bible which uses various methods, such as "emphatic idiom" and special diacritical marks, to bring out nuances of the underlying Greek, Hebrew, and Aramaic texts. Rotherham was a Bible scholar and minister of the Churches of Christ, who described his goal as "placing the reader of the present time in as good a position as that occupied by the reader of the first century for understanding the Apostolic Writings".

The New Testament Critically Emphasised was first published in 1872. However, great changes occurred in textual criticism during the second half of the 19th century, culminating in Brooke Foss Westcott's and Fenton John Anthony Hort's Greek text of the New Testament. This led Rotherham to revise his New Testament twice, in 1878 and 1897, to stay abreast of scholarly developments.

The entire Bible with the Old Testament appeared in 1902. Rotherham based his Old Testament translation on Dr. C.D. Ginsburg's comprehensive Masoretico-critical edition of the Hebrew Bible, which anticipated readings now widely accepted.

Rotherham's translation has stayed in print over the years because of the wealth of information it presents. John R Kohlenberger III says in his preface to the 1994 printing, "The Emphasized Bible is one of the most innovative and thoroughly researched translations ever done by a single individual.  Its presentation of emphases and grammatical features of the original languages still reward careful study."

References

Rotherham, Joseph Bryant. Rotherham's Emphasized Bible (Grand Rapids: Kregel Publications, 1994).
Rotherham, Joseph George. Reminiscences extending over a period of more than seventy years (London: H. R. Allenson, Ltd., 1922).

External links

The Emphasized Bible searchable text
The Emphasized Bible 1902 edition GoogleBooks copy.
The Emphasized Bible Online (at jw.org)

Bible translations into English
Churches of Christ
Restoration Movement
1902 non-fiction books
1902 in Christianity